Septentrinna bicalcarata is a species of true spider in the family Corinnidae. It is found in North America.

References

Corinnidae
Articles created by Qbugbot
Spiders described in 1896